Alaa El-Din Abdoun (born 19 February 1965) is an Egyptian basketball player. He competed in the 1988 Summer Olympics.

References

1965 births
Living people
Basketball players at the 1988 Summer Olympics
Egyptian men's basketball players
Olympic basketball players of Egypt